An independent scientist (historically also known as gentleman scientist) is a financially independent scientist who pursues scientific study without direct affiliation to a public institution such as a university or government-run research and development body. The expression "gentleman scientist" arose in post-Renaissance Europe, but became less common in the 20th century as government and private funding increased.

Most independent scientists have at some point in their career been affiliated with some academic institution, such as Charles Darwin, who was affiliated with the Geological Society of London.

History
Self-funded scientists practiced more commonly from the Renaissance until the late 19th century, including the Victorian era, especially in England, before large-scale government and corporate funding was available.  Many early fellows of the Royal Society in London were independent scientists.

Benefits and drawbacks
Self-funding has the disadvantage that funds may be more restricted; however, it has the advantage of eliminating a number of inconveniences such as teaching obligations, administrative duties, and writing grant requests to funding bodies. It also permits the scientist to have greater control over research directions, as funding bodies direct grants towards interests that may not coincide with that of the scientist. Furthermore, intellectual property of the inventions belongs to the inventor and not the employer.

Modern science requires competence and may require access to scientific equipment. However, independent scientists may have past careers as funded scientists, cooperate with funded colleagues, obtain partial equipment-only grants or choose directions where the most expensive resource required is the researcher's time. If the research succeeds, independent scientists may publish results in the same peer-reviewed journals as funded scientists do.

Scientists may choose to work on unusual projects with high risk of failure also when the grant system does not fund them. A scientist could be attributed the status of independent scientist if they work on such projects during a gap between two academic positions, for example.

Modern-day independent scientists
Modern-day independent scientists who fund their own research on an independent basis include, for example, Stephen Wolfram who funds his research through the sale of Mathematica software, Julian Barbour, Aubrey de Grey, Barrington Moore, Susan Blackmore, James Lovelock, and John Wilkinson who funds his research on "molecular synergism in nature" by running a regulatory scientific consultancy in natural products.

Peter Rich said of Peter D. Mitchell: "I think he would have found it difficult to have gotten funding because his ideas were rather radical." Mitchell went on to win the Nobel Prize in Chemistry in 1978. Chemist Luis Leloir funded the research institute he headed, the Institute for Biochemical Research, in Buenos Aires, Argentina. He won the Nobel Prize for chemistry in 1970.

There are today several virtual research institutes for independent scientists, including the Ronin Institute and the National Coalition of Independent Scholars.

Notable independent scientists

 Mary Anning
 Elizabeth Garrett Anderson
 Aristotle
 Hertha Ayrton
 Charles Babbage
 Julian Barbour
 Robert Boyle
 James Braid
 Mark Catesby
 Henry Cavendish
 John Dalton
 Charles Darwin
 Christopher J. Date
 Robert C. Edgar
 Albert Einstein
 Carlo Fornasini
 Benjamin Franklin
 Goldsworthy Gurney
 Oliver Heaviside
 Caroline Herschel
 Robert Kraichnan
 George Frederick Kunz
 Antoine Lavoisier
 Alfred Lee Loomis
 A. Garrett Lisi
 Ada Lovelace
 James Lovelock
 Gregor Mendel
 Isaac Newton
 Joseph Priestley
 David Rittenhouse
 David E. Shaw
 Alexander Shulgin
 Mary Somerville
 Henry Fox Talbot
 Nikola Tesla
 John Wilkinson (scientist)
 Stephen Wolfram
 Thomas Young
 Lord Salisbury
 Konstantin Eduardovitch Tsiolkovsky

See also
 Citizen science
 Small Science and Big Science

References

Sources

 
Science occupations
Science and culture
Victorian era
Science and technology in the United Kingdom
Royal Society